The 2021–22 TCU Horned Frogs men's basketball team represented Texas Christian University during the 2021–22 NCAA Division I men's basketball season. The team was led by sixth-year head coach Jamie Dixon, and played their home games at Schollmaier Arena in Fort Worth, Texas as a member of the Big 12 Conference. They finished the season 21–13, 8–10 in Big 12 play to finish in fifth place. As the No. 5 seed in the Big 12 tournament, they defeated Texas in the quarterfinals, before losing to Kansas in the semifinals. They received an at-large bid to the NCAA tournament as the No. 9 seed in the South Region, where they defeated Seton Hall in the first round before losing to Arizona in the second round in an overtime thriller.

With their win over Seton Hall in the first round, the Horned Frogs won their first NCAA tournament game since 1987.

Previous season
In a season limited due to the ongoing COVID-19 pandemic, the Horned Frogs finished the 2020–21 season 12–14, 5–11 in Big 12 play to finish in a tie for eighth place. They lost in the first round of the Big 12 tournament to Kansas State.

Offseason

Departures

Incoming transfers

Recruiting classes

2021 recruiting class
There were no incoming recruiting class of 2021.

2022 recruiting class

Roster

Schedule and results

|-
!colspan=12 style=|Regular season

|-
!colspan=12 style=| Big 12 tournament

|-
!colspan=12 style=| NCAA tournament

Source

References

TCU Horned Frogs men's basketball seasons
TCU Horned Frogs
TCU Horned Frogs men's basketball
TCU